The Eastern Regional Organization for Public Administration (EROPA) was formed "In order to advance the economic and social development of the Region through the promotion of the study, practice and status of public administration and adoption of adequate administrative systems", by international treaty signed in Manila in the Philippines on 19 June 1958. EROPA was officially formed on 5 December 1960.

EROPA is a partner of the United Nations Public Administration Network (UNPAN). EROPA also has special consultative status with the United Nations Economic and Social Council.

The Philippines remains the center for its activities, since having hosted the first Regional Conference on Public Administration 7 to 20 June 1958, with EROPA being based out of National College of Public Administration and Governance, University of the Philippines, Quezon City, Philippines.

In addition to the headquarters in the Philippines, it has four active centers:
 Development Management Center (South Korea) in conjunction with the National Human Resources Development Institute in Gyeonggi Province
 Human Resource Research Center (formerly E-Government Research Center) (China) in conjunction with the Chinese Academy of Personnel Science in Beijing
 Local Government Center (Japan) in conjunction with the Local Autonomy College in Tokyo 
Policy Studies Center (Indonesia) in conjunction with the National Institute of Public Administration in Jakarta. 
 Training Center (India) in conjunction with the Indian Institute of Public Administration in New Delhi

Membership
The membership of EROPA includes states, institutions, and individuals.

(Current/Active) State members:
  (founding member)
  (founding member)
  (founding member)
  (assumed from the founder member )
  (1961)
  (1962)
  (1966, 2022)
  (1969)
  (1983)

(Current/Inactive) State members
  (1963)
  (1985)

(Former) State members:
  (founding member)
  (1965)
  (1976)
  (1995)

Conferences
List of conferences organized by EROPA (as per their website):

Publications
EROPA produces the biannual journal Asian Review of Public Administration (ARPA) since 1989. The organization also produces the quarterly newsletter EROPA Bulletin since 1976.

References

External links

Asian Review of Public Administration (ARPA) official website

Intergovernmental organizations established by treaty
Treaties of Australia
Treaties of Vietnam
Treaties of the Philippines
Treaties of India
Treaties of Thailand
Treaties of Indonesia
Treaties of Iran
Treaties of China
Treaties of South Korea
Treaties of Nepal
Treaties of Japan
Treaties of Pakistan
Treaties of Taiwan
Organizations based in Metro Manila